Spitalfields Neighbourhood Planning Forum is a Neighbourhood Forum made up of local Spitalfields residents, business operators and community organisations who represent the range of interests in the Spitalfields Neighbourhood Area (which is a business neighbourhood area). The area covered is a small part of the London Borough of Tower Hamlets, London, mainly along that borough's western border with the City of London. The bounds of the neighbourhood area were designed to cover a similar area to the ancient parish of Spitalfields.

The Spitalfields Neighbourhood Planning Forum (or SNPF) was officially designated by Mayor of Tower Hamlets John Biggs in April 2016. The conditions for neighbourhood forum designation are set out in the Town and Country Planning Act 1990 and the powers of Neighbourhood Forums to create Neighbourhood Plans are set out in the Localism Act 2011. Tower Hamlets has several other neighbourhood forums in Limehouse, East Shoreditch and the Isle of Dogs that have been similarly designated by the council and which allow local people to help shape neighbourhood planning policies and local services in their area.

External links
spitalfieldsforum.org.uk

Spitalfields